This list of mammals of Kyrgyzstan comprises 43 mammal species recorded in Kyrgyzstan, of which four are endangered, five are vulnerable, and three are near threatened.

The following tags are used to highlight each species' conservation status as assessed by the International Union for Conservation of Nature:

Order: Rodentia (rodents) 

Rodents make up the largest order of mammals, with over 40% of mammalian species. They have two incisors in the upper and lower jaw which grow continually and must be kept short by gnawing.
Suborder: Sciurognathi
Family: Sciuridae (squirrels)
Subfamily: Xerinae
Tribe: Marmotini
Genus: Marmota
 Gray marmot, M. baibacina 
 Long-tailed marmot, M. caudata 
 Menzbier's marmot, M. menzbieri 
Genus: Spermophilus
 Tien Shan ground squirrel, S. relictus 
Family: Dipodidae (jerboas)
Subfamily: Allactaginae
Genus: Allactaga
 Vinogradov's jerboa, A. vinogradovi
Family: Gliridae (dormice)
Subfamily: Leithiinae
Genus: Dryomys
 Forest dormouse, D. nitedula
Family: Cricetidae
Subfamily: Arvicolinae
Genus: Clethrionomys
 Tien Shan red-backed vole, C. centralis
Genus: Ellobius
 Alai mole vole, E. alaicus 
Genus: Microtus
 Tien Shan vole, M. kirgisorum
Family: Muridae (mice, rats, voles, gerbils, hamsters)
Subfamily: Gerbillinae
Genus: Meriones
 Midday jird, M. meridianus
 Tamarisk jird, M. tamariscinus
Subfamily: Murinae
Genus: Rattus
Brown rat, R. norvegicus  introduced
Turkestan rat, R. turkestanicus

Order: Lagomorpha (lagomorphs) 

The lagomorphs comprise two families, Leporidae (hares and rabbits), and Ochotonidae (pikas). Though they can resemble rodents, and were classified as a superfamily in that order until the early 20th century, they have since been considered a separate order. They differ from rodents in a number of physical characteristics, such as having four incisors in the upper jaw rather than two.
Family: Leporidae (hares)
Genus: Lepus
 Desert hare, L. tibetanus 
Tolai hare, L. tolai 
Family: Ochotonidae (pikas)
Genus: Ochotona
 Large-eared pika, O. macrotis 
 Turkestan red pika, O. rutila

Order: Erinaceomorpha (hedgehogs and gymnures) 

The order Erinaceomorpha contains a single family, Erinaceidae, which comprise the hedgehogs and gymnures. The hedgehogs are easily recognised by their spines while gymnures look more like large rats.
Family: Erinaceidae (hedgehogs)
Subfamily: Erinaceinae
Genus: Hemiechinus
 Long-eared hedgehog, H. auritus

Order: Soricomorpha (shrews, moles, and solenodons) 

The "shrew-forms" are insectivorous mammals. The shrews and solenodons closely resemble mice while the moles are stout-bodied burrowers.
Family: Soricidae (shrews)
Subfamily: Crocidurinae
Genus: Crocidura
Lesser white-toothed shrew, C. suaveolens 
Subfamily: Soricinae
Tribe: Nectogalini
Genus: Neomys
 Eurasian water shrew, N. fodiens
Tribe: Soricini
Genus: Sorex
 Eurasian pygmy shrew, S. minutus

Order: Chiroptera (bats) 

The bats' most distinguishing feature is that their forelimbs are developed as wings, making them the only mammals capable of flight. Bat species account for about 20% of all mammals.

Family: Vespertilionidae
Subfamily: Myotinae
Genus: Myotis
Lesser mouse-eared bat, M. blythii 
Geoffroy's bat, M. emarginatus 
Genus: Nyctalus
Common noctule, N. noctula 
Subfamily: Vespertilioninae
Genus: Eptesicus
 Botta's serotine, E. bottae 
Family: Rhinolophidae
Subfamily: Rhinolophinae
Genus: Rhinolophus
Greater horseshoe bat, R. ferrumequinum 
Lesser horseshoe bat, R. hipposideros

Order: Carnivora (carnivorans) 

There are over 260 species of carnivorans, the majority of which feed primarily on meat. They have a characteristic skull shape and dentition. 
Suborder: Feliformia
Family: Felidae
Subfamily: Felinae
Genus: Felis
 Jungle cat, F. chaus , presence uncertain
 African wildcat, F. lybica 
 Asiatic wildcat, F. l. ornata
Genus: Lynx
Eurasian lynx, L. lynx 
Genus: Otocolobus
Pallas's cat, O. manul 
Subfamily: Pantherinae
Genus: Panthera
Snow leopard, P. uncia 
Suborder: Caniformia
Family: Canidae
Genus: Canis
Gray wolf, C. lupus 
Steppe wolf, C. l. campestris
Genus: Vulpes
Corsac fox, V. corsac 
Red fox, V. vulpes 
Genus: Cuon
Dhole, C. alpinus 

Family: Ursidae (bears)
Genus: Ursus
Brown bear, U. arctos 
Family: Mustelidae (mustelids)
Genus: Lutra
Eurasian otter, L. lutra 
Genus: Martes
Beech marten, M. foina 
Genus: Meles
Asian badger, M. leucurus 
Caucasian badger, M. canescens 
Genus: Mustela
Mountain weasel, M. altaica 
Stoat, M. erminea 
Steppe polecat, M. eversmannii 
Least weasel, M. nivalis

Order: Artiodactyla (even-toed ungulates) 

The even-toed ungulates are ungulates whose weight is borne about equally by the third and fourth toes, rather than mostly or entirely by the third as in perissodactyls. There are about 220 artiodactyl species, including many that are of great economic importance to humans.
Family: Bovidae (cattle, antelope, sheep, goats)
Subfamily: Antilopinae
Genus: Gazella
Goitered gazelle, G. subgutturosa 
Subfamily: Bovinae
Genus: Bison
 European bison, B. bonasus  introduced
Subfamily: Caprinae
Genus: Capra
Siberian ibex, C. sibrica 
Genus: Ovis
Argali, O. ammon 
Family: Cervidae (deer)
Subfamily: Cervinae
Genus: Cervus
Wapiti, C. canadensis 
Tian Shan wapiti, C. c. songaricus
Subfamily: Odocoileinae
Genus: Capreolus
 Siberian roe deer, C. pygargus 
Family: Suidae
Subfamily: Suinae
Genus: Sus
Wild boar, S. scrofa

Locally extinct 
The following species are locally extinct in Kyrgyzstan:
Tiger, Panthera tigris

References

External links

See also
List of chordate orders
Lists of mammals by region
Mammal classification

Kyrgyzstan
Fauna of Kyrgyzstan
Mammals